Bigger and Brighter is the sixth album by Count Basic, released in 2002.

Track listing

"All the Things" - 4:23
"Call My Name" - 3:49
"Aint You Had Enough" - 4:26
"Follow" - 4:54
"Higher" - 4:00
"User" - 3:53
"Maya (Instrumental)" - 4:46 
"Bigger & Brighter" - 4:20
"Not Enough" - 4:02
"Leave It Up To You" - 3:10
"Make Me Believe Again" - 3:27
"Consequences" - 4:02
"See You Again" - 4:32
"24 Bit Sushi" - 6:32

Count Basic albums
2002 albums